Peccadillo is derived from the diminutive of the Spanish language word "pecado" meaning sin.

The term may refer to:

 a minor misdemeanor, especially sexual misconduct
 an infraction of an ethical code
 Peccadillos, the third album from American singer-songwriter Susan Herndon
 Peccadillo Pictures, a British film distributor
 Peccadillo at the Palace, the second novel in the Annie Oakley historical mystery series by Kari Bovée